The Manila Metrostars were a professional basketball team in the now-defunct Metropolitan Basketball Association from 1998 to 2001. The team was the 1999 MBA National Champions and holds the MBA record of winning 22 consecutive games during the said season. The team was merged with the Batangas Blades in the 2001 season. In 1998, the Metrostars played home games at numerous venues such as the Ninoy Aquino Stadium, the Ateneo Blue Eagle Gym, Rizal Memorial Coliseum and a host of others before playing permanently at the Mail and More Arena (now San Andres Gym).

History
In 1998, the Metropolitan Basketball Association was formed as a regional-based professional league which also challenged the commercial Philippine Basketball Association. The team made the biggest steal of all when they acquired Rommel Adducul straight out of the San Sebastian College - Recoletos. The team also had Alex Compton, an American citizen who was born in the Philippines. Others include ex-PBA veterans Peter Martin, Frechie Ang, Ruben Dela Rosa and former Far Eastern University star Nestor Echano. 

In their inaugural season, the Metrostars were coached by Ricky Dandan but lost to the eventual champion Pampanga Dragons in the Northern Conference Finals, 4–2. In 1999, Letran Knights head coach Louie Alas took over the reins as head coach while adding former PBL and Cebu native Gilbert Demape. The Metrostars had an early 4–2 record, but went on an incredible 22-game winning run before finishing the elimination phase with a 26–4 record. The Metrostars dethroned the Dragons in the Northern semis before beating the Pasig-Rizal Pirates in the Northern Conference finals. In the National Finals against the Cebu Gems, the Metrostars won their only MBA National title, 4–2. One of the memorable games during the series was a three-overtime shootout between Compton and Cebu's Dondon Hontiveros before Manila won the game on the road. Compton was named as the 1999 league MVP.

The Metrostars failed to defend their MBA crown in 2000 as they lost to the San Juan Knights in the Northern Conference Finals. In 2001, the Metrostars and the Batangas Blades agreed on a merger, retaining the Blades name. This eliminated the Manila Metrostars franchise as Adducul (the MVP of the 2000 season), Compton and a few holdovers from the squad joined the Blades.

Uniforms
In 1998, the Metrostars was the first official game uniforms the color was blue green, red and white contains the team logo during the inaugural season of the league. In 1999, the team replaced by blue, navy blue and white contains the logo were used their won the National Championship team in that jerseys. From year 2000 season, the Metrostars was used the alternate jersey with LBC logo and also the team logo in the left that was used before the merger with Batangas Blades in 2001.

Home Arenas
Ninoy Aquino Stadium (1998)
Rizal Memorial Coliseum (1998)
Mail and More Arena (now San Andres Gym) (1999–2000)
Blue Eagle Gym (1998–2000)

Notable players

Rommel Adducul
Freche Ang
Jojo Brines
Augustus Ceasar Brown
Don Camaso
Nonoy Chuatico
Joel Co
Alex Compton
Reuben dela Rosa
Gilbert Demape
Nestor Echano
Erwin Framo

Nandy Garcia
Alrich Jareno
Jasper Javier
June Longalong
Dino Manuel
Peter Martin
Cadel Mosqueda
Lino Ong
Jonathan "Chuchu" Serrano
Chito Victolero

Coaching Staff:

 Ricky Dandan
 Louie Alas
 Nonoy Chuatico
 Alan Altamirano
 Ariel Vanguardia
 Cesar Pohlen
 Boysie Zamar
 Aldrin Cruz

References

Metropolitan Basketball Association teams
Basketball teams established in 1998
Sports teams in Metro Manila
Basketball teams disestablished in 2001
1998 establishments in the Philippines
2001 disestablishments in the Philippines